The 2004–05 NBA season was the Minnesota Timberwolves’ 16th season competing in the National Basketball Association. After appearing in the Conference Finals the previous season, the Timberwolves played at around .500 for the first half of the season. However, the team began to struggle further into the season, losing six straight games between January and February and slipping below .500. After a 25–26 start, longtime head coach Flip Saunders was fired and replaced with general manager Kevin McHale for the remainder of the season. The Timberwolves improved under McHale's management, but finished the season in third position in the Northwest Division. With a 44–38 regular season record, they missed the playoffs for the first time since 1996. Kevin Garnett led the team in scoring, rebounding and assists, as he was selected for the 2005 NBA All-Star Game. Following the season, Latrell Sprewell retired after turning down a contract extension, Sam Cassell was traded to the Los Angeles Clippers, and McHale was fired as coach. This marked the beginning of over a decade of futility for the Timberwolves. From 2005 to 2018, they failed to make the playoffs.

Draft picks

Roster

Regular season

Season standings

Record vs. opponents

Player statistics

Awards and records
 Kevin Garnett, NBA All-Defensive First Team

References

Minnesota Timberwolves seasons
2004 in sports in Minnesota
2005 in sports in Minnesota
Monnesota